Gerald Curle (7 June 1893 – 4 March 1977) was an English cricketer.  Curle was a right-handed batsman who bowled right-arm off break.  He was born at Leamington Spa, Warwickshire, and was educated at King Edward's School, Birmingham.

Curle made his first-class debut for Warwickshire against Hampshire in the 1913 County Championship.  He made four further first-class appearances for the county in that season, the last of which came against Leicestershire.  In his five first-class matches, he scored 54 runs at an average of 6.00, with a high score of 34.  He also took a single wicket with the ball.

He died at Budleigh Salterton, Devon, on 4 March 1977.  His brother, Arthur, was also a first-class cricketer.

References

External links
Gerald Curle at ESPNcricinfo
Gerald Curle at CricketArchive

1893 births
1977 deaths
Sportspeople from Leamington Spa
People educated at King Edward's School, Birmingham
English cricketers
Warwickshire cricketers